Hoplomyzon sexpapilostoma is a species of banjo catfish endemic to Venezuela where it is found in the Orinoco River basin.  It is the giant of the genus reaching a length of 3.2 cm.

References 
 

Aspredinidae
Fish of Venezuela
Endemic fauna of Venezuela
Fish described in 1990